The 51st Annual Miss Puerto Rico Universe pageant was held on November 10, 2005 in Puerto Rico. Cynthia Olavarría, who won the title of Miss Puerto Rico Universe 2005, crowned her successor Zuleyka Rivera of Salinas as Miss Puerto Rico Universe 2006. Zuleyka represented Puerto Rico at Miss Universe 2006 in Los Angeles, California, USA and won it.

Results

Contestants

Notes
 Miss Salinas, Zuleyka Rivera, represented Puerto Rico at Miss Universe 2006 in Los Angeles, California, USA on July 23, 2006 where she became the fifth Puerto Rican woman to obtain the title of Miss Universe.
 Miss Moca, Yeidy Bosques, later competed at Miss Universe Puerto Rico 2010 where she represented the municipality of Mayagüez and finished as the 3rd runner-up. She was later crowned Miss Earth Puerto Rico 2010 and competed at Miss Earth 2010 where finished as Miss Earth-Fire (3rd runner-up), Puerto Rico's second and highest placement so far at Miss Earth.

Historical significance
 Salinas won Miss Puerto Rico Universe for the fourth time, the last was Cynthia Olavarría in 2005.
 The following municipalities also made the semi-finals last year were Ponce, San Juan, Río Piedras, and Salinas.
 Salinas is now the fourth municipality to obtain two consecutive wins after Ponce, San Juan, and San Germán.
 Juana Diaz last placed in 1998.
 Yauco last placed in 2001.
 Añasco and Utuado last placed in 2002.
 Dorado and Toa Alta last placed in 2003.
 Trujillo Alto last placed in 2004.

References

Puerto Rico 2006
2005 in Puerto Rico
2006 beauty pageants